Chen Ying-long (15 January 1926 – 22 July 2011) was a Taiwanese sprinter. He competed for China in the men's 400 metres at the 1948 Summer Olympics.

References

1926 births
2011 deaths
Athletes (track and field) at the 1948 Summer Olympics
Chinese male sprinters
Taiwanese male sprinters
Olympic athletes of Taiwan
Asian Games medalists in athletics (track and field)
Athletes (track and field) at the 1954 Asian Games
Athletes (track and field) at the 1958 Asian Games
Medalists at the 1954 Asian Games
Medalists at the 1958 Asian Games
Asian Games silver medalists for Chinese Taipei
Asian Games bronze medalists for Chinese Taipei
People from Yunlin County